Events in the year 1563 in Norway.

Incumbents
Monarch: Frederick II

Events
 13 August – The Northern Seven Years' War starts.

Arts and literature

Births

Deaths

See also

References